Blackwater fever is a complication of malaria infection in which red blood cells burst in the bloodstream (hemolysis), releasing hemoglobin directly into the blood vessels and into the urine, frequently leading to kidney failure. The disease was first linked to malaria by the Sierra Leone Creole physician  John Farrell Easmon in his 1884 pamphlet entitled The Nature and Treatment of Blackwater Fever. Easmon coined the name "blackwater fever" and was the first to successfully treat such cases following the publication of his pamphlet.

Signs and symptoms
Within a few days of onset there are chills, with rigor, high fever, jaundice, vomiting, rapidly progressive anemia, and dark red or black urine.

Causes
The cause of hemolytic crises in this disease is unknown (mainly due to intravascular haemolysis). There is rapid and massive destruction of red blood cells resulting in hemoglobinemia (hemoglobin in the blood, but outside the red blood cells), hemoglobinuria (hemoglobin in urine), intense jaundice, anuria (passing less than 50 milliliters of urine in a day), and finally death in the majority of cases.

The most probable explanation for blackwater fever is an autoimmune reaction apparently caused by the interaction of the malaria parasite and the use of quinine. Blackwater fever is caused by heavy parasitization of red blood cells with Plasmodium falciparum.  However, there have been other cases attributed to Plasmodium vivax, Plasmodium malariae, Plasmodium knowlesi.

Blackwater fever is a serious complication of malaria, but cerebral malaria has a higher mortality rate. Blackwater fever is much less common today than it was before 1950. It may be that quinine plays a role in triggering the condition, and this drug is no longer commonly used for malaria prophylaxis. Quinine remains important for treatment of malaria.

Diagnosis

Treatment
The treatment is antimalarial chemotherapy, intravenous fluid and sometimes supportive care such as intensive care and dialysis.

Society and culture

Prominent victims
 Prior to his photography career, Henri Cartier-Bresson contracted blackwater fever while hunting in Western Africa. Expecting to die, he sent instructions to his family on his wishes for a funeral. He made a full recovery.
 Zoologist John Samuel Budgett died from the disease in 1904, after returning from a collecting trip to West Africa, in search of specimens of the fish Polypterus.
 Missionary and explorer George Grenfell died after a bad attack of blackwater fever at Basoko on 1 July 1906.
 Jesse Brand, a missionary to the Chat Mountains in India, died of blackwater fever in 1928.
 Actor Don Adams, best known as Maxwell Smart from the popular sitcom Get Smart and as the title character in Inspector Gadget, contracted blackwater fever after being shot in combat at Guadalcanal during World War II. Adams was evacuated from his United States Marine Corps unit to a hospital in New Zealand where he ultimately made a full recovery.
 Humanitarian and MMA fighter Justin Wren contracted malaria, which devolved into blackwater fever, while drilling water-wells for Congo Pygmies in 2013. The affliction nearly claimed Wren's life. He was misdiagnosed four times and required airlift to Uganda, where he narrowly recovered from severe symptoms.
 Aeneas, Jeannie Gunn's husband, is described as having died from Blackwater Fever or Malarial Dysentry at Elsey Station in the Northern Territory in 1903. She later authored the classic account We of the Never Never.
 Bernard Deacon
 Peter Cameron Scott, a Scottish-American missionary and founder of Africa Inland Mission, died from the disease in December 1896.
 Henry Stricker, South African cricketer

Cultural references 
 Out of Africa, a 1985 film based on the experiences of author Isak Dinesen
 The Power of One, a 1992 film based on the book of the same name
 The Bridge on the River Kwai, a 1957 film about prisoners of war in a jungle environment
 At Play in the Fields of the Lord, a 1965 novel by Peter Matthiessen
 West with the Night (1942), African memoir by aviator Beryl Markham
 Burmese Days, a 1934 novel by George Orwell; several associates of Flory are noted to have died of blackwater fever in chapter 5
 Showdown, a 1946 novel by Errol Flynn
 The Heart of the Matter, a 1948 novel by Graham Greene
 Green Hills of Africa, a 1935 novel by Ernest Hemingway
 The Book of Secrets, a 1994 novel by M. G. Vassanji
 The Blackwater Fever, a blues band out of Australia
 An Ice-Cream War, a 1982 novel by William Boyd set during the First World War in German East Africa
 Liberia as I Know It, a 1929 memoir by medical missionary Clinton Caldwell Boone
 Showa: A History of Japan, a 2014 four-part autobiographical graphic novel of the Showa period in Japanese history Shigeru Mizuki
 Stand on Zanzibar, a 1968 science-fiction novel by John Brunner quotes a line from the sea chanty "The Bight of Benin": "The bight of Benin, the bight of Benin!  Blackwater fever and pounds of quinine!"
 Blackwater: A True Epic of the Sea, a 1958 memoir of a ship's crew stricken with blackwater fever, by H.L. Tredree
 The Mottled Lizard, a 1962 memoir of Kenya by Elspeth Huxley
 Wolfenstein: The Old Blood, referenced by Wesley (Agent One) near the beginning of the game

See also
 Malarial nephropathy

References

Malaria